A list of notable people who were at some point a member of the defunct Nazi Party (NSDAP). This is not meant to be a list of every person who was ever a member of the Nazi Party. This is a list of notable figures who were active within the party and did something significant within it that is of historical note or who were members of the Nazi Party according to multiple reliable publications. For a list of the main leaders and most important party figures see: List of Nazi Party leaders and officials.

Overview A–E F–K L–R S–Z

L

Bodo Lafferentz
Willy Lages
Erwin Lambert
Heinz Lammerding
Hans Lammers
Felix Landau
Carl Langbehn
Herbert Lange
Rudolf Lange
Johanna Langefeld
Franz Langoth
Carl Lautenschläger
Hartmann Lauterbacher
Julius Friedrich Lehmann
Fritz Lehmann
Rudolf Lehmann (military judge)
Georg Leibbrandt
Helmut Lemke
Tiana Lemnitz
Fritz Lenz
Siegfried Lenz
Josef Leopold
Ernst Lerch
Arthur Liebehenschel
Heinz Linge
Felix Linnemann
Prince Bernhard of Lippe-Biesterfeld
Julius Lippert
Kurt Lischka
Karl Litzmann
Wilhelm Friedrich Loeper
Ernst Friedrich Lohndorff
Bruno Lohse
Hinrich Lohse
Enno Lolling
Gustav Lombard
Konrad Lorenz
Werner Lorenz
Hans Loritz
Georg Lörner
Joseph Lortz
Hans Louis Ferdinand von Löwenstein zu Löwenstein
Franz Lucas
Kurt Ludecke
Erich Ludendorff
Hanns Ludin
Martin Luther (diplomat)
Viktor Lutze

M

Heinz Macher
Fritz Mackensen
Georg Hans Madelung
Waldemar Magunia
Ernst Mally
Wilhelm Rudolf Mann
Maria Mandel
Werner March
Elisabeth Marschall
Benno Martin
Heinrich Matthes
Gisela Mauermayer
Rudolf Mauersberger
Emil Maurice
Freidrich Maurer
Friedrich Mauz
Josef Mayr
Emil Mazuw
Fritz ter Meer
Herbert Mehlhorn
Werner Meinhof
Josef Albert Meisinger
Hans-Otto Meissner
Guido von Mengden
Josef Mengele
Oswald Menghin
Pieter Menten
Willi Mentz
Rudolf Mentzel
Christian Mergenthaler
Willy Messerschmitt
Adolf Metzner
Alfred Meyer
Emil Heinrich Meyer
Konrad Meyer
Kurt Meyer
Hermann Michel
Agnes Miegel
August Miete
Erhard Milch
Leopold von Mildenstein
Rudolf Mildner
Erich Mix
Helmut Möckel
Karl Möckel
Paul Moder
Wilhelm Mohnke
Robert Mohr
Otto Moll
Eberhard Wolfgang Möller
Theodor Morell
Georg Konrad Morgen
Hans Joachim Moser
Hans Möser
Joachim Mrugowsky
Reinhold Muchow
Hellmuth von Mücke
Hermann Muhs
Eric Muhsfeldt
Robert Mulka
Heinrich Müller (Gestapo)
Ludwig Müller
Paul Heinrich Theodor Müller
Alfred Müller-Armack
Hans Münch
Ludwig Münchmeyer
Eugen Munder
Franz Murer
Wilhelm Murr
Lothar Müthel
Martin Mutschmann

N

Alfred Naujocks
Erich Naumann
Hans Naumann
Werner Naumann
Arthur Nebe
Josef Neckermann
Otto Nerz
Hermann Neubacher
Erich Neumann (politician)
Konstantin von Neurath
Elly Ney
Karl Nicolussi-Leck<ref>Franz Kurowski: Panzer Aces II, Stackpole Books, 2004, pp. 274–6</ref>
Oskar von Niedermayer
Herms Niel
Hans Nieland
Johann Niemann
Paul Nitsche
Emil Nolde
Gustav Adolf Nosske
Franz Novak
Walter Nowotny

O

Carl Oberg
Josef Oberhauser
Herta Oberheuser
Theodor Oberländer
Max Oehler
Richard Oehler
Rudolf August Oetker 
Paul Ogorzow
Otto Ohlendorf
Wilhelm Ohnesorge
Alice Orlowski
Werner Ostendorff
Heinrich Oster
Wilfred von Oven

P

Alexander Palfinger
Gerhard Palitzsch
Günther Pancke
Friedrich Panse
Friedrich Panzinger
Siegfried Passarge
Franz von Papen
Max Pauly
Bartosz Pawlak
Friedrich Peter
Kurt Petter
Wilhelm Pfannenstiel
Franz Pfeffer von Salomon
Helmut Pfeiffer
Josef Pfitzner
Walter Pfrimer
Philipp, Landgrave of Hesse
Franz Philipp
Anton Piëch
Hermann Pister
Ludwig Plagge
Otto Planetta
Paul Pleiger
Alfred Ploetz
Kurt Plötner
Franz Podezin
Max Poepel
Oswald Pohl
Johannes Popitz
Helmut Poppendick
Ferdinand Porsche
Hermann Prieß
Karl-Heinz Priester
Alfred Proksch (politician)
Hans-Adolf Prützmann
Carl Friedrich von Pückler-Burghauss
Emil Puhl

Q

Walter Quakernack
Günther Quandt
Herbert Quandt
Rudolf Querner

R

Peter Raabe
John Rabe
Franz Rademacher
Erich Raeder
Karl Rahm
Otto Rahn
Rudolf Rahn
Boris Rajewsky
Friedrich Rainer
Roland Rainer
Kurt Ranke
Otto Rasch
Karl Rasche
Sigmund Rascher
Ernst vom Rath
Walter Rauff
Hermann Rauschning
Paul Reckzeh
Wilhelm Rediess
Eggert Reeder
Anni Rehborn
Günther von Reibnitz
Hermann Reinecke
Heinz Reinefarth
Wilhelm Reinhard (SS officer)
Fritz Reinhardt
Anton Reinthaller
Hans Conrad Julius Reiter
Lothar Rendulic
Adrian von Renteln
Cecil von Renthe-Fink
Andreas Rett
Hermann Reutter
Ernst Graf zu Reventlow
Eugen Rex
Joachim von Ribbentrop
Gustav Richter
Bolko von Richthofen
Georg Rickhey
Alfred Rieche
Fritz Rieger
Walter Riehl
Gustav Riek
Johannes Riemann
Renate Riemeck
Julius Ringel
Karl Ritter
Karl Ritter (director)
Carl-Heinz Rodenberg
Arthur Rödl
Walter Rohland
Ernst Röhm
Karl von Roques
Eduard Roschmann
Gerhard Rose
Alfred Rosenberg
Erwin Rösener
Gerhard Roßbach
Fritz Rössler
Paul Rostock
Helge Rosvaenge
Alfred Roth
Erich Roth
Erich Rothacker
Oswald Rothaug
Curt Rothenberger
Artur Rother
Heinz Röthke
Carl Röver
Jutta Rüdiger
Ernst Rüdin
Arthur Rudolph
Joachim Rumohr
Philipp Rupprecht
Bernhard Rust

References
Hans Ruppel,Heinrich Ruppel, Karl Ruppel,Georg Ruppel.

Bibliography
Klee, Ernst: Das Personenlexikon zum Dritten Reich. Wer war was vor und nach 1945. Fischer Taschenbuch Verlag, Zweite aktualisierte Auflage, Frankfurt am Main 2005 
Klee, Ernst Das Kulturlexikon zum Dritten Reich. Wer war was vor und nach 1945. S. Fischer, Frankfurt am Main 2007 
Snyder, Louis Leo, Encyclopedia of the Third Reich'', Ware: Wordsworth Editions, 1998 (originally published New York City: McGraw-Hill, 1976)

External links
A-Z category of Nazi Party members on German Wikipedia

 
Nazis